Sbai is a surname linked to the Idrissid Moorish tribe of the Oulad Bou Sbaa. Notable people with the surname include:
Abderrahmane Sbai (1940-2010), Moroccan politician and civil servant
Hassanine Sbaï (born 1984), Tunisian race-walker
 Ismaïl Sbaï (born 1980), Moroccan racing driver
Salaheddine Sbaï (born 1985), Moroccan footballer
 Souad Sbai (born 1961), Moroccan-born Italian politician and writer
 Youssef Sbai (born 1978), Tunisian weight-lifter